Urocerus gigas (giant woodwasp, banded horntail, greater horntail) is a species of sawfly native to the Palearctic realm and North Africa.

Subspecies:
U. gigas gigas
U. gigas taiganus

U. gigas is a wood-boring insect that attacks softwoods of freshly felled logs/unhealthy trees. The species lives in discrete tunnels, frequently filled with hard-packed coarse fibrous frass, hard to dig out from tunnels.

Urocerus flavicornis was once considered a subspecies of gigas but is now known to be a separate species .

References

Siricidae
Insects described in 1758
Taxa named by Carl Linnaeus